Heidi Specogna (born 5 January 1959) is a Swiss filmmaker. She has contributed to the South American and African cinema by making the critically acclaimed films, Das kurze Leben des José Antonio Gutierrez, Cahier africain and Tupamaros.

Personal life
She was born on 5 January 1959 in Biel/Bienne, Switzerland.

Career
She attended the journalism school in Zurich and then worked as a journalist for various German-Swiss press media. Then she studied at the German Film and Television Academy in Berlin from 1982 to 1988. After graduating from the academy, she became a lecturer at the Film Academy Baden-Württemberg for documentary film since 2003. In 1985, her short film Traces won the Bern Film Prize.

She focused largely on cinema of Latin America and Africa for her filmmaking particularly through her own production house founded in 1990. In 1991, she made the debut with the documentary Tania la Guerillera about the Bolivian guerrilla fighter 'Tamara Bunke'. In 1993, she made the film Rosa about the illegal activity of a radio operator for the Rote Kapelle. Then in 1996 she played the role Tupamaros, a guerrilla movement from Uruguay, in the documentary of the same name.

In 2011 she made the documentary Carte Blanche which is focused on the Central African Republic. Her film The Short Life of José Antonio Gutierrez won the Swiss Film Award 2007 for best documentary and the Adolf Grimme Prize. Then the film Carte Blanche was named the best German-language documentary film in Duisburg in 2011 and later awarded the Catholic Media Prize. The film Goal hunter's ship received the prize of the youth jury in Leipzig and her 'girl story' titled Esther und die Geister was awarded the German human rights prize. In 2017, her film Cahier Africain based on the crisis-ridden Central African Republic, received the German Film Prize Lola, as well as the Swiss Film Prize for Best Documentary at the German Human Rights Film Prize, as well as the Silver Dove in Leipzig and in 2018 the Adolf Grimme Prize.

In 2019, Specogna awarded with the Konrad Wolf Prize at the Academy of the Arts. In 2020, The Solothurn Film Festival dedicated the special program “Rencontre” to Specogna for remembering her contribution to the African cinema.

Filmography

Awards and accolades
 2007: Swiss Film Award in the Best Documentary Film category for The Short Life of José Antonio Gutierrez
 2008: Adolf Grimme Prize for The Short Life of José Antonio Gutierrez
 2011: 3sat documentary film award for Carte Blanche
 2012: German Human Rights Film Award for Esther and the Ghosts
 2013: Catholic Media Prize for Carte Blanche
 2016: German human rights film award for Cahier africain
 2017: Swiss Film Prize and German Film Prize LOLA for Cahier africain (Best Documentary)
 2019: Konrad Wolf Prize

See also
 Jonathan Akpoborie
 16th Busan International Film Festival
 Political cinema
 Salena Godden
 Hispanics in the United States Marine Corps

References

External links
 

Living people
Swiss film directors
1959 births